Come in un'ultima cena is the sixth studio album by Italian progressive rock band Banco del Mutuo Soccorso. The English version of the album was released with the title As in a Last Supper.

Track listing

Music by Vittorio Nocenzi except (5, 6, 8) by Gianni Nocenzi. Lyrics by Francesco Di Giacomo and Vittorio Nocenzi.

Personnel

 Vittorio Nocenzi – keyboards
 Gianni Nocenzi – keyboards, clarinet
 Francesco Di Giacomo – vocals
 Rodolfo Maltese – Guitar, trumpet, vocals
 Pierluigi Calderoni – drums, percussion
 Renato D'Angelo – Bass, guitar

Guest musicians

 Angelo Branduardi - Violin

1976 albums
Banco del Mutuo Soccorso albums